Bombax costatum is a tree usually reaching a height of 5 – 15 m. It flowers in the dry season before the leaves appear.

Distribution

Its distribution is restricted to the savanna zones of West Africa from Senegal to the Central African Republic. It is often found on rocky hills or lateritic crusts.

Use
The calyx is used in West African cuisine as a base of sauces. Excessive harvesting of flowering branches contributes to the decline of the species.

External links

costatum
Taxa named by François Pellegrin